Criminal Minds  was officially renewed for a ninth season on May 9, 2013 and premiered on CBS  and CTV, on September 25, 2013.  The season consists of 24 episodes with the 200th episode being episode 14 of the season, and the finale on 14 May. This new season is said to reveal more on the past of Agent Jennifer "JJ" Jareau. "We're going to use the serendipitous gift of Season 6 to explain with flashbacks what happened when she was working for the Pentagon and why she came back as a much tougher character. I've never had a chance to flex my acting muscles like this on the show!" said A. J. Cook. The season also featured the return of Paget Brewster and Jayne Atkinson for the 200th episode, which aired on February 5, 2014. 
On May 14, 2014, it was revealed at the end of the season finale that Alex Blake (Jeanne Tripplehorn) would be leaving the show.

Cast
The entire main cast returned for the ninth season; however, Esai Morales replaced Jayne Atkinson as the new Section Chief for the FBI's Behavioral Analysis Unit (BAU).

Main 
 Joe Mantegna as Supervisory Special Agent David Rossi (BAU Senior Agent)
 Shemar Moore as Supervisory Special Agent Derek Morgan (BAU Agent)
 Matthew Gray Gubler as Supervisory Special Agent Dr. Spencer Reid (BAU Agent)
 A. J. Cook as Supervisory Special Agent Jennifer "JJ" Jareau (BAU Agent)
 Kirsten Vangsness as Special Agent Penelope Garcia (BAU Technical Analyst & Co-Communications Liaison)
 Jeanne Tripplehorn as Supervisory Special Agent Dr. Alex Blake (BAU Agent)
 Thomas Gibson as Supervisory Special Agent Aaron "Hotch" Hotchner (BAU Unit Chief & Co-Communications Liaison)

Special guest stars 
 Paget Brewster as Agent Emily Prentiss (Chief of Interpol-London Office)

Recurring 
 Esai Morales as Supervisory Special Agent Mateo "Matt" Cruz (BAU Section Chief)
 Rochelle Aytes as Savannah Hayes
 Cade Owens as Jack Hotchner
 Mekhai Andersen as Henry LaMontagne
 Nicholas Brendon as Kevin Lynch
 Meredith Monroe as Haley Hotchner
 Josh Stewart as William "Will" LaMontagne Jr.

Guest stars 
 Jayne Atkinson as Erin Strauss
C. Thomas Howell as George Foyet / The Reaper 
 Eva LaRue as Tanya Mays

Episodes

Ratings

U.S. ratings

Live + 7 Day (DVR) ratings

Home media

References

General references

External links
 

Criminal Minds
2013 American television seasons
2014 American television seasons